Thomas Alfred Woolnoth (1785–1857) was an English engraver. He was known for his portraits of theatre people. He also painted, and engraved works of Correggio and Van Dyck. Woolnoth was engraver to Queen Victoria. His work was also included in Cadell and Davies Britannia depicta.

Notes

External links

 An engraving of a painting , with a poetical illustration by Letitia Elizabeth Landon for Heath’s Book of Beauty, 1833.
 , an engraved picture for Fisher's Drawing Room Scrap Book, 1835, with a poetical illustration by Letitia Elizabeth Landon.
 An engraving of Murillo's  for Fisher's Drawing Room Scrap Book, 1837 with a poetical illustration by Letitia Elizabeth Landon.

1785 births
1857 deaths
English engravers